The 1926 Akron Indians season was their seventh and final season in the league and only season as the Indians. The team failed to improve on their previous output of 4–2–2, winning only one game. They tied for sixteenth in the league.

Schedule

Standings

References

Akron Pros seasons
Akron Indians
Akron Pros